Alex dos Santos Gonçalves (born 20 May 1990) is a Brazilian professional footballer who plays as a forward for Monsoon.

Career
Born in Porto Alegre, Alex played in the youth categories of Grêmio, before moving abroad to Serbian club Teleoptik in August 2008, which is the satellite club of Serbian giants FK Partizan. Alex spent two seasons with Teleoptik, the first one along 3 more countryman, Washington Santana da Silva, Jefferson Madeira and Elton Martins, helping Teleoptik to finish 2nd in the 2008–09 Serbian League Belgrade, one of Serbian 3rd tiers, thus earning promotion to the 2009–10 Serbian First League. Next season they did well and finished 6th in second tier. Next, he returned to his homeland and signed a short-term contract with Fluminense in August 2010. Later on, Alex renewed his contract with Fluminense until the end of the 2012 season. He was subsequently loaned out to Internacional, making his Série A debut. In January 2012, Alex moved to Europe for the second time, being sent on loan to Romanian club Concordia Chiajna. He was loaned to fellow Romanian side Universitatea Cluj in July 2012.

In February 2013, after his contract with Fluminense expired, Alex signed with Tombense. He briefly played on loan at América de Natal, making his Série B debut, before transferring to Romania for the third time, on a season-long loan to Pandurii Târgu Jiu in August 2013. In June 2014, Alex moved to Portugal and joined Primeira Liga newcomers Moreirense on another season-long loan. He was subsequently loaned to Turkish side Yeni Malatyaspor in July 2015. Six months later, his loan was terminated and Alex returned to Tombense, making his Série C debut.

Statistics

Honours

References

External links
 
 
 

América Futebol Clube (RN) players
Araxá Esporte Clube players
Association football forwards
Botafogo Futebol Clube (PB) players
Botafogo Futebol Clube (SP) players
Brazilian expatriate footballers
Brazilian expatriate sportspeople in Portugal
Brazilian expatriate sportspeople in Serbia
Brazilian expatriate sportspeople in Turkey
Brazilian expatriate sportspeople in Romania
Brazilian expatriate sportspeople in Indonesia
Brazilian expatriate sportspeople in Malaysia
Brazilian footballers
Campeonato Brasileiro Série A players
Campeonato Brasileiro Série B players
Campeonato Brasileiro Série C players
Capivariano Futebol Clube players
CS Concordia Chiajna players
CS Pandurii Târgu Jiu players
Esporte Clube Água Santa players
Expatriate footballers in Portugal
Expatriate footballers in Romania
Expatriate footballers in Serbia
Expatriate footballers in Turkey
Expatriate footballers in Indonesia
Expatriate footballers in Malaysia
FK Teleoptik players
Fluminense FC players
Liga I players
Moreirense F.C. players
Primeira Liga players
Serbian First League players
Sport Club Internacional players
TFF First League players
Tombense Futebol Clube players
Yeni Malatyaspor footballers
Sertãozinho Futebol Clube players
Persela Lamongan players
Persikabo 1973 players
Melaka United F.C. players
Persita Tangerang players
Veranópolis Esporte Clube Recreativo e Cultural players
Liga 1 (Indonesia) players
Malaysia Super League players
1990 births
Living people